Union councils of Satkhira District are the smallest rural administrative and local government units in Satkhira District of Bangladesh. The district consists of two municipalities, 7 upazilas, 79 union porishods, 8 thana (police station) and 1436 villages.

Assasuni Upazila
Assasuni has 11 unions, 143 mauzas and 242 villages.

 Shovnali Union
 Budhhata Union
 Kulla Union
 Dargahpur Union
 Baradal Union
 Asasuni Union
 Sreeula Union
 Khajra Union
 Anulia Union
 Protapnagar Union
 Kadakati Union

Kalaroa Upazila
Kalaroa has 12 unions/wards, 123 mauzas/mahallas, and 138 villages.

 Joynagar Union
 Jalalabad Union
 Koyla Union
 Langoljhara Union
 Keragasi Union
 Sonabaria Union
 Chandanpur Union
 Keralkata Union
 Helatala Union
 Kushodanga Union
 Deara Union
 Jugikhali Union

Kaliganj Upazila
Kaliganj has 12 Unions/Wards, 244 Mauzas/Mahallas, and 256 villages.

 Krishnagar Union
 Bishnupur Union
 Champaphul Union
 Dakshin Sreepur Union
 Kushulia Union
 Nalta Union
 Tarali Union
 Bharashimla Union
 Mathureshpur Union
 Dhalbaria Union
 Ratanpur Union
 Moutala Union

Tala Upazila
Tala has 12 Unions/Wards, 150 Mauzas/Mahallas, and 229 villages.

 Nagarghata Union
 Sarulia Union
 Kumira Union
 Dhandia Union
 Islamkati Union
 Tala Union
 Khalishkhali Union
 Magura Union
 Tetulia Union
 Kheshra Union
 Jalalpur Union
 Khalilnagar Union

Debhata Upazila
Debhata has 5 Unions/Wards, 59 Mauzas/Mahallas, and 122 villages.

 Kulia Union
 Parulia Union
 Sakhipur Union
 Noapara Union
 Debhata Union

Shyamnagar Upazila
Shyamnagar has 1 Paurashava (Municipality) 11 Unions/Wards, 127 Mauzas/Mahallas, and 216 villages.

 Bhurulia Union
 Kashimari Union
 Shyamnagar Union
 Nurnagar Union
 Kaikhali Union
 Ramjannagar Union
 Munsigang Union
 Ishwaripur Union
 Burigoalini Union
 Atulia Union
 Padmapukur Union
 Gabura Union

Satkhira Sadar Upazila
Satkhira Sadar has 14 Unions/Wards, 155 Mauzas/Mahallas, and 235 villages.

 Banshdaha Union
 Kushkhali Union
 Baikari Union
 Ghona Union
 Shibpur Union
 Bhomra Union
 Alipur Union
 Dhulihar Union
 Brahmarajpur Union
 Agardari Union
 Jhaudanga Union
 Balli Union
 Labsa Union
 Fingri Union

References 

Local government in Bangladesh